The Higher Institute of Dramatic Arts (HIDA), was founded in Damascus, Syria, in 1977 by academics such as the playwright Saadallah Wannous, theatre critic Ghassan al-Maleh and professor of theatre at Damascus University, Hannan Kassab Hassan. The institute initiated a new phase in the development of theatre in Syria through the preparation of a new generation of actors in aspects of modern dramatic arts on an academic basis, among them actor Fares Al-Helou and playwright Liwaa Yazji. The institute initially included five departments: Acting, Literary Criticism, Dramatic Arts, Scenography, and Theatre Techniques, with a department for Dance added later.

Another notable artists of the younger generation is Noura Mourad, an expert in dance and movement in theatre, who became a teacher at the institute for modern dance and performance. Mourad is also director of Leish Troupe, an ensemble for movement theatre that won the prize for best scenography in the Cairo International Festival of Experimental Theater in 2000. In her study titled Syrian Radical Dabka, ethnomusicologist Shayna Silverstein described the changes in social interpretations and performances of the Middle-Eastern dabke folk dance as performed in Syria. Further, Silverstein reported about a contemporary dance show in 2009 by Mourad and her troupe, titled “Congratulations!”. Focusing on the performance of dance in Syrian weddings, this choreography included issues of gender and power in the institution of marriage and the general doublestandards facing women in Syrian society. 

The institute has succeeded in rapidly making its mark on the theatre and dramatic arts scene of the Middle East, with performances in Kuwait, Egypt, Jordan, Lebanon, Germany and other countries. In his academic study on the social position of intellectuals and market forces, exemplified by commercial TV in Syria, Adwan Ziad, a former professor at the institute, "explores how the Higher Institute of Dramatic Arts in Damascus achieved an exceptional degree of prestige in Syrian cultural life. Although operating under a dictatorship in a conservative country, HIDA still enjoyed unusual margins of curricula autonomy and free expression in a country that repressed other cultural and educational sectors."

Location 
The Higher Institute of Dramatic Arts is situated near Umayyad Square next to the Higher Institute of Music and the Damascus Opera House.

References

 
Universities in Syria
Education in Damascus
Buildings and structures in Damascus
Educational institutions established in 1977
1977 establishments in Syria
Art schools in Syria